The women's singles was one of four lawn tennis events on the Tennis at the 1906 Intercalated Games program.

The tournament was played on clay courts at the Athens Lawn Tennis Club, and five players, all Greek, competed (a French and two Greek players withdrew after the draw to concentrate on the mixed doubles).

22-year-old Esmée Simirioti won the gold medal by defeating Sophia Marinou in three sets.

This is one of two events that featured a specific match to determine the bronze medal winner, in which Euphrosine Paspati won the bronze medal.

Draw

Draw

References

External links
  ITF, 2008 Olympic Tennis Event Media Guide
 Official results archive (ITF)

Tennis at the 1906 Intercalated Games
1906 in women's tennis